Mary Ellyn Caasi is a Filipino basketball player who played at center position for the Philippines women's national basketball team. She stood 5'11 ft tall and weighed 200 pounds. Caasi is a native of Alaminos, Pangasinan.

Education
Caasi studied criminology at the University of Manila.

Basketball career
Caasi played for the Dagupan-based Luzon Colleges. While playing for Luzon, she was scouted by Nic Jorge, secretary general of the Basketball Association of the Philippines, to play for the national team.

She was part of the squad that participated at the 1997 SEABA Championship for Women. The team defeated Malaysia, 58-53 where Caasi scored 15 points. However, she was fouled-out during the controversial final game against eventual champions, Thailand due to questionable referee calls. The said game ended in a 66–90 defeat.

By 2005, Caasi has participated in three Southeast Asian Games.

References

Living people
Filipino women's basketball players
Philippines women's national basketball team players
Basketball players from Pangasinan
Centers (basketball)
1970s births
University of Manila alumni